

Service
The 32nd Maine Infantry Regiment was organized at Augusta, Maine, between March 3 and May 6, 1864. Six companies left Maine for Washington, D.C., April 20, 1864. The remaining four companies left Maine for Washington on May 11, 1864, and Joined the rest of the regiment at North Anna River, Va, on May 26, 1864. At the point they were attached to the 2nd Brigade, 2nd Division, IX Corps, Army of the Potomac until the regiment was amalgamated with the 31st Maine Infantry Regiment on December 12, 1864.

Battles and Campaigns
Campaign from the Rapidan to the James River, Virginia, May 3-June 15, 1864. 
Battle of the Wilderness May 5–7. 
Spotsylvania May 8–12. 
Spotsylvania Court House May 12–21. 
North Anna River May 23–26. 
On line of the Pamunkey May 26–28. 
Totopotomoy May 28–31. 
Cold Harbor June 1–12. 
Bethesda Church June 1–3. 
Before Petersburg June 16–19. 
Siege of Petersburg June 16, 1864, to December 12, 1864. 
Battle of the Crater (Burnside's Mine), Petersburg, July 30. 
Weldon R. R. August 18–21. 
Poplar Springs Church September 29-October 2.
Boydton Plank Road, Hatcher's Run, October 27–28.

Total Strength and Casualties
The Regiment lost a total of 202 men during service, 4 Officers and 81 Enlisted men killed and mortally wounded, 3 Officers and 114 Enlisted men by disease.

Commanders
 Colonel Mark Fernald Wentworth

See also

 List of Maine Civil War units
 Maine in the American Civil War

References
Houston,Henry C The Thirty-Second Maine Regiment of Infantry Volunteers, Press of Southworth Brothers, Portland,Maine, 1903

External links
State of Maine Civil War Records Website
Photograph of the 32nd Maine Infantry from the Maine Memory Network

32nd Maine Regiment
Military units and formations established in 1864
1864 establishments in Maine
Military units and formations disestablished in 1864